Glenelg may refer to

Places

Australia
 Glenelg, South Australia, a beachside suburb of Adelaide
 Glenelg River (Victoria)
 Glenelg River (Western Australia)
 Glenelg County, Western Australia, a former county
 Shire of Glenelg, Victoria
 Shire of Glenelg (former), Victoria, abolished in 1994
 City of Glenelg, a local government area in South Australia
 Electoral district of Glenelg (South Australia), a former district of the South Australian House of Assembly 
 Electoral district of Glenelg (Victoria), a former district of the Victorian Legislative Assembly

Canada
 Glenelg Parish, New Brunswick, Canada
 Glenelg, Nova Scotia, Canada, a community
 Glenelg, Ontario, Canada, a former township which was merged into West Grey township

Elsewhere
 Glenelg, Highland, Scotland, a community area and civil parish
 Glenelg, Maryland, United States, an unincorporated community
 Glenelg, Mars

Sports
 Glenelg Baseball Club, a member of the South Australian Baseball League
 Glenelg Cricket Club, a cricket team bsed in Adelaide
 Glenelg Football Club, an Australian rules football team based in Glenelg East, South Australia
 Glenelg Golf Club, a private golf club in the Adelaide suburb of Novar Gardens
 Glenelg Tigers (NBL), a defunct basketball team based in Glenelg, South Australia
 Glenelg Oval, a sports stadium in Adelaide, South Australia
 Glenelg (horse), a British-American Thoroughbred racehorse

Other uses
 Charles Grant, 1st Baron Glenelg (1778–1866), Scottish politician and colonial administrator
 two ships of the Royal Australian Navy:
 , a corvette commissioned in 1942
 , a patrol boat commissioned in 2008
 Glenelg tram line, Adelaide, South Australia
 Glenelg Highway, a highway in south-eastern Australia
 Glenelg High School, Maryland, United States
 Glenelg Country School, a nonsectarian, co-educational independent day school in Howard County, Maryland

See also
 Glenelg East, South Australia, a suburb of Adelaide
 Glenelg North, South Australia, a suburb of Adelaide
 Glenelg South, South Australia, a suburb of Adelaide
 Glen Elg, a character from Phoenix Wright: Ace Attorney − Trials and Tribulations, a game in the Ace Attorney series for Nintendo DS